Liaisons: Re-Imagining Sondheim from the Piano is a triple album performed by the pianist Anthony de Mare; ECM Records released the album in 2015. It consists of pieces inspired by the American musical theatre composer Stephen Sondheim's oeuvre and has works written by various classical, jazz, and other composers. The album consists of 37 tracks and is over three hours long. Composers who wrote pieces on the album include Jason Robert Brown, Michael Daugherty, Jake Heggie, Fred Hersch, Gabriel Kahane, Phil Kline, Ricardo Lorenz, Wynton Marsalis, Nico Muhly, Thomas Newman, Steve Reich, and Duncan Sheik. The album received mostly positive reviews.

Conception and planning
De Mare hired Rachel Colbert to produce the project and began contacting Sondheim in 2007. De Mare initially planned on having between 20 and 25 works in the project but he eventually settled on inviting 36 composers. Each composer was able to "re-imagine" any Sondheim song they wished; de Mare requested that they kept the original melody and most of the harmonies, let them know they should be able to change the structure, and asked them to not deconstruct the song, although some did so. 

Milton Babbitt, who had once taught Sondheim, had originally been chosen as one of the composers to participate in the project; his piece would have been inspired by "I'm Still Here" from Follies. His student, Frederic Rzewski replaced Babbitt upon his death in 2011. Adam Guettel was invited but declined due to feeling nervous; Elvis Costello, Sting, and Tori Amos had to decline participation due to a lack of time. Sondheim himself suggested de Mare invite Jason Robert Brown, Derek Bermel, and David Shire to compose pieces for the project. Of the thirty-six composers who contributed works, thirty-one were men and five were women. Thirty-two of them were born in the United States. The composers' ages ranged from late 20s to 80s. 

Individuals and institutions commissioned each of the pieces from the various composers. The Clarice Smith Performing Arts Center commissioned Kenji Bunch's, Jake Heggie's, Frederic Rzewski's, and Bernadette Speach's pieces. The Schubert Club commissioned Mary Ellen Childs's piece and the Banff Centre commissioned Rodney Sharman's piece. Notable individuals who helped commission pieces include James S. Marcus, Beth Rudin DeWoody, and Benjamin M. Rosen. All works had been completed by 2014.

Twelve of Sondheim's musicals are represented by this album, chronologically spanning from A Funny Thing Happened on the Way to the Forum (1962) to Passion (1994). The Frogs and Bounce are notable musicals which Sondheim wrote the music for which are not represented. Over a third of the tracks are inspired by either Sunday in the Park with George or Sweeney Todd.

Writing and production
The composers' backgrounds are in a variety of genres including classical, jazz, and rock, although the majority of the songs were written by contemporary classical composers. Most of the pieces are purely written for solo piano, although some pieces also featured a backing track or minor other metaphorical "bells 'n whistles". Duncan Sheik's "Johanna in Space" features a track made of several guitar improvisations layered through a tape echo.  Jason Robert Brown's "Birds of Victorian England" and Steve Reich's  are both written for multiple pianos. Certain songs like Andy Akiho's "Into the Woods", and Jherek Bischoff's "The Ballad of Guiteau", and Ricardo Lorenz's "The Worst (Empanadas) In London" feature a few words of spoken or sung dialogue. Bischoff's piece also features the slamming of a piano lid and creaking of the piano bench, and Michael Daugherty's "Everybody's Got The Right" features a shot from a prop gun. Akiho's piece was also written for a prepared piano, requiring screws and other objects to be placed in the piano strings to alter the sound.

The album was recorded between 2010 and 2014 at the American Academy of Arts and Letters and at Greenfield Recital Hall, Manhattan School of Music. The album's production was in part financed via an Indiegogo campaign.

Reception

Naomi Graber's review in the Journal of the Society for American Music called it "a fascinating contribution to American piano music". Jed Distler's review for Gramophone called it a "fascinating, excellently produced collection". Jesse Green called it an "astonishing" recording in New York; listening to the album was one of the magazine's entries in its "To Do" section. Joshua Kosman for the San Francisco Chronicle called the recording "indispensable" and "irresistible". Michael Feingold for The Village Voice praised de Mare's "ineffably precise playing" and referred to the compositions as "a treasure trove of approaches". Raymond Tuttle's album review in Fanfare said "most listeners probably will find something to love and something else to annoy them here" and criticized the "over-pedaled quality to many of these readings". Elliot Fisch's review in American Record Guide said de Mare performed all the songs "excellently", said the sound was "excellent", and that "this unique project deserves your attention". 

Tom Huizenga named the album one of NPR's ten favorite classical albums of 2015. Anthony Tommasini also named it as one of the best classical music recordings of 2015 for The New York Times. Graham Rickson of The Arts Desk listed it as one of the best ten classical CDs of 2015, and called the album "superb", describing it as "magnificently recorded and beautifully produced". Anne Midgette for The Washington Post included it as one of her top five favorite classical recordings of 2015.

Stuart Derdeyn included Liaisons as one of "25 albums you may have missed but shouldn't have in 2015" in an article for The Province. Ted Gioia included Liaisons in a list of 20 "under-the-radar" albums of 2015 for The Daily Beast. Tom Huizenga included it as one of NPR's top 50 albums of 2015. Andre Dansby, for the Houston Chronicle, listed Liaisons as his 16th favorite album of 2015. The Guardian jazz critic John Fordham also listed this album as one of his favorite albums of 2015.

Judith Sherman won the Grammy Award for Producer of the Year, Classical at the 58th Annual Grammy Awards in part for her work on Liaisons.

Tracks
The album consists of three discs and thirty-seven tracks. Information about the specific Sondheim pieces each work is inspired by comes from the sheet music.

Personnel
Credits are adapted from the liner notes.

 Rachel Colbert – Producer for The Liaisons Project
 Judy Sherman – Recording producer and engineer
 Jeanne Velonis – Additional engineer and editing assistant
 Kevin Boutote – Engineer for backing tracks for "Birds of Victorian England"
 Duncan Sheik – Provider for backing track for "Johanna In Space"
 Christoph Stickel – Mastering
 Steve Lake – Mastering
 Paolo Soriani – Liner photos
 Fred R. Conrad – Liner photos
 Jerry Jackson – Liner photos
 Bernd Kuchenbeiser – Design

Charts
Liaisons was on Billboard Top Classical Albums chart for four weeks, with a peak position of 15 the week of October 24, 2015. It also spent four weeks on Billboard Top Classical Crossover Albums peaking at 11 the week of October 17, 2015.

References

Further reading

External links
 
 ECM Records Catalog entry
 
 
 

Stephen Sondheim
2015 classical albums
ECM New Series albums
Indiegogo projects